Wild Greens are a youth movement of the Greens, usually associated with one of the Green Parties.

It began in 1997 as a semi-autonomous wing of the Green Party of Aotearoa New Zealand, committed to direct action and taking risks of bodily harm to protect the environment.  The Green Party's youth arm has since been renamed to Young Greens. The movement has since spread to Canada, Australia, and elsewhere in the English-speaking world.  They are strongly associated with the anti-globalisation movement.

See also
 Bioneers
 Water Keeper

External links
Young Greens of Aotearoa New Zealand - Young Greens Official Homepage
Green Party of Aotearoa New Zealand People: Nandor Tanczos - see section on Wild Greens.

Youth wings of green parties